The Anti-Submarine Warfare Frigate (ASWF) is a project of the Royal Netherlands Navy (RNLN, Dutch: Koninklijke Marine) and Belgian Navy to replace the existing Multipurpose- or M-frigates. The project shows similarities to the British Global Combat Ship (also formerly named FSC program) but development is fully separate.

Context 
The current M-frigates, originally all built in the Netherlands but apart from two units sold to Belgium, Portugal, and Chile are reaching their planned retirement age around 2020. However, due to extensive budget cuts over the past decades and other large materiel programs such as the acquisition of the F-35  for the Royal Netherlands Air Force, the Dutch Ministry of Defense currently has not enough funds available to start building the ships. Therefore, lifespan of the current vessels has been extended until 2025. Keeping the ships any longer will cause problems with NATO and related tasks because the ships weapons suite is outdated and not up to current standards. For example: the M-frigates only carry 16 surface-to-air missiles in the form of the outdated NATO Sea Sparrow (RIM-7). Onboard recent ships the Evolved Sea Sparrow (Block 2 in development) does the job, but those do not fit in the also outdated Mk48 VLS cells on board the M-frigates. Apart from these, M-frigates only have a single Goalkeeper system for CIWS. Offensive, capabilities are limited to obsolete RGM-84 Harpoon missiles. The 76mm cannon is not fit for modern semi-guided munitions like DART, Davide/STRALES, or VULCANO.

Additionally; the RNLN searched for European partners to build the ships with and cut costs, and in January 2017 reached an agreement with the Belgian Marine Component to build a total of four ships together. This number could be adjusted later on during next phases of the acquisition process. With a total of four and two for the RNLN the current two M-frigates are to be replaced by an equal number. There are concerns about whether that number is enough to meet current and near future challenges, since it often happens the RNLN has no ships available to only fulfill the most basic of its duties (like supporting foreign navy ships along the Dutch coast). The costs for the 4 ships are currently estimated at 1.50-2.50 billion euro's for the two Dutch frigates and 1 billion euro's for the two Belgian frigates. Originally it had been hoped that the first frigate would be delivered to the Royal Netherlands Navy in 2024, while the first frigate for the Belgian Navy was to be delivered in 2027. However, as of 2020, the in-service date for the two Dutch frigates had slipped to 2028-29 with the Belgian frigates following immediately thereafter.

Specifications 
In June 2020, the Dutch Ministry of Defence sent a letter to parliament, which included information about the specifications and capacities of the new frigates 

Crew: up to 110 (with space for an additional 40)

Weapon Systems:
 OTO Melara 76 mm Sovraponte capable of firing guided ammunition
  2 Mark 41 Vertical Launching System 16 cells for anti-air missiles (Dutch variant); 1 Mk 41 VLS 8 cells (Belgian variants)
 quadpacked RIM-162 Evolved Sea Sparrow Missile Block 2
 autocannon
 Anti-ship missile
 Replacement Mk46 Lightweight Torpedo
 Softkill anti-torpedo system
 Hard-kill anti-torpedo torpedo (if available)
 CIWS RAM, RIM-116 Rolling Airframe Missile
 light machine guns

Helicopter: 1 NH90 NFH

Other equipment: Integrated Hull Sonar, Towed Sonar Array, 2 RHIB with MAG guns, Drone Launch Pad

See also 
 Future of the Royal Netherlands Navy
 De Zeven Provinciën-class frigate

References

Bibliography
 
 
 
 

Proposed ships of the Royal Netherlands Navy
Belgian Navy
Frigate classes